Nicolas Demorand (born May 5, 1971) is a French journalist who works as a producer, host and editor of French public radio station France Inter. He was the executive editor of French daily Libération from 2011 to 2014.

Early life 
Demorand was born on May 5, 1971 in Vancouver, British Columbia, the son of Jacques Demorand, former chief of staff of Secretary of State Roland Dumas and Jewish pied-noir Jacqueline Bouaniche.

Personal life 
His partner is the French public radio station France Culture journalist , with whom he has two children born in 2007 and 2009.

External links

References

1971 births
Living people
Franco-Columbian people
Journalists from British Columbia
Lycée Henri-IV alumni
French male journalists
French radio journalists
French radio presenters
French radio producers
People from Vancouver
Radio France people